Arnel Bluffs is a series of rock outcrops in a steeply-falling ice scarp south of the Leckie Range, Antarctica. It was plotted in December 1958 by an Australian National Antarctic Research Expeditions dog-sledge party led by G.A. Knuckey, and named by the Antarctic Names Committee of Australia for R.R. Arnel, geophysical assistant at Mawson Station, 1958.

References
 

Cliffs of Antarctica
Landforms of Enderby Land